Seen It All may refer to:

Songs
 "Seen It All" (Jake Bugg song), from the 2013 album Jake Bugg by Jake Bugg
 "Seen It All" (Jeezy song), from the 2014 album of the same name by Jeezy
 "Seen It All", a song by Korn from See You on the Other Side

Albums
 Seen It All: The Autobiography by Young Jeezy, 2014
Seen It All, a 2018 EP by Shea Diamond

See also
 "I've Seen It All", a song by Björk from the album Selmasongs.